Itebej can refer to:

 Srpski Itebej, a village in Vojvodina, Serbia.
 Novi Itebej, a village in Vojvodina, Serbia.